Ornidia major is a species of Hoverfly in the family Syrphidae.

Distribution
It is found in Costa Rica, Panama, Ecuador, and Peru.

References

Diptera of South America
Diptera of North America
Insects of Central America
Insects described in 1930
Eristalinae
Taxa named by Charles Howard Curran